Sir Fiennes Cecil Arthur Barrett-Lennard (2 April 1880 – 26 January 1963) was a British colonial judge and soldier.

Family
Barrett-Lennard was the son of Captain Thomas George Barrett-Lennard (great-grandson of Sir Thomas Barrett-Lennard, 1st Baronet) and Edith Mackenzie. He married Winifrede Mignon Berlyn in 1916. They had one son, Hugh, who subsequently inherited the Barrett-Lennard baronetcy.

Career
Barret-Lennard was appointed as one of the Puisne Judges of the Supreme Court of the Gold Coast (later Ghana) in 1913. He was subsequently a judge in the Straits Settlement. He was appointed Chief Justice of Jamaica in 1925 and was knighted the following year. 

As Chief Justice, in 1929, he ordered the confiscation of the property of the Universal Negro Improvement Association (UNIA) which had been founded by black activist, Marcus Garvey.  He retired in 1932 and after retiring, he claimed his retirement was forced on him by ill health that resulted from having been poisoned. 

He returned to London, becoming a lecturer at Birkbeck College and wrote a paper on colonial law published in the Transactions of the Grotius Society.

References

1880 births
1963 deaths
Knights Bachelor
Chief justices of Jamaica
Jamaican knights
Colony of Jamaica judges
20th-century Jamaican judges
British people in the British Gold Coast
British people in British Malaya
British people in British Jamaica